(The) Wheels on the Bus may refer to:

"The Wheels on the Bus", a children's song
The Wheels on the Bus (video series), educational series for children
"Wheels on the Bus", a 2019 song by Melanie Martinez from her album K-12
Wheels On the Bus, a 1991 moving-parts children's picture book by Paul O. Zelinsky